This is a list of teams in the Czech Republic Football Leagues. As of the 2021/22 season.

First level - Czech First League 
AC Sparta Prague
SK Slavia Prague
FC Viktoria Plzeň
FC Baník Ostrava
FC Slovan Liberec
FK Jablonec
1. FC Slovácko, Uherské Hradiště
MFK Karviná
FK Mladá Boleslav
FK Teplice
SK Sigma Olomouc
Bohemians 1905, Prague
FC Fastav Zlín
SK Dynamo České Budějovice
FC Hradec Králové
FK Pardubice

Second level - Czech National Football League 
FC Zbrojovka Brno
1. FK Příbram
SFC Opava
FC Vysočina Jihlava
FK Dukla Prague
SK Líšeň, Brno
FK Fotbal Třinec
FK Ústí nad Labem
FK Varnsdorf
FC Sellier & Bellot Vlašim
FK Viktoria Žižkov, Prague
1. SK Prostějov
MFK Chrudim
FC MAS Táborsko, Tábor
AC Sparta Prague B
MFK Vyškov

Third level

Bohemian Football League - ČFL

Group A 

FK Baník Sokolov
FK Slavoj Vyšehrad, Prague
FC Slavia Karlovy Vary
FC Písek
TJ Jiskra Domažlice
FK Králův Dvůr
SK Rakovník
Loko Vltavín, Prague
SK Slavia Prague B
FC Viktoria Plzeň B
FK Motorlet Prague 
SK Benešov
FK Admira Prague
Povltavská fotbalová akademie, Štěchovice
1. FK Příbram B
Sokol Hostouň

Group B 

Jiskra Ústí nad Orlicí
TJ Sokol Živanice
SK Zápy
Sokol Brozany
Slovan Velvary
FK Chlumec nad Cidlinou
FK Zbuzany 1953
FK Přepeře
FC Slovan Liberec B
FK Jablonec B
FK Mladá Boleslav B
FK Teplice B
Bohemians 1905 B, Prague
FK Dukla Prague B
FC Hradec Králové B
FK Pardubice B

Moravian–Silesian Football League - MSFL 
MFK Frýdek-Místek
1. SC Znojmo
SK Hanácká Slavia Kroměříž
FC Hlučín
FC Velké Meziříčí
FC Viktoria Otrokovice
SK Uničov
ČSK Uherský Brod
FK Blansko
FC Slovan Rosice
SFK Vrchovina Nové Město na Moravě
FC MSA Dolní Benešov
FC Vratimov
SK Sigma Olomouc B
FC Baník Ostrava B
FC Fastav Zlín B
1. FC Slovácko B, Uherské Hradiště
FC Vysočina Jihlava B

Fourth level - Divize

Group A 
SK Klatovy 1898
FK Hvězda Cheb
FK Hořovicko, Hořovice
FC Viktoria Mariánské Lázně
FC Rokycany
FC Senco Doubravka, Plzeň
FK ROBSTAV Přeštice
SK Petřín Plzeň
FK Jindřichův Hradec 1910
Tatran Sedlčany
FK Spartak Soběslav
SK Otava Katovice
Český lev-Union Beroun
Slavoj Mýto
Sokol Lom
SK Dynamo České Budějovice B

Group B 
FC Chomutov
SK Kladno
SK Aritma Prague
FK Meteor Prague VIII 
FK Arsenal Česká Lípa
SK Český Brod
FK Baník Souš, Most
TJ Tatran Rakovník
FK Brandýs nad Labem
MFK Dobříš
FK Neratovice–Byškovice
FK Ostrov
SK Štětí
FK Seko Louny
SK Slaný
FK Olympie Březová

Group C 
TJ Dvůr Králové nad Labem
FK Čáslav
FK Kolín
FK Náchod
FK Letohrad
MFK Trutnov
TJ Sokol Libiš
Sparta Kutná Hora
FC Hlinsko
SK Vysoké Mýto
FK Velké Hamry
SK Benátky nad Jizerou
SK Kosmonosy
FC Horky nad Jizerou
SK Poříčany
SK Tochovice

Group D 
FC Žďas Žďár nad Sázavou
MSK Břeclav
FC Slovan Havlíčkův Brod
FC Zbrojovka Brno B
Tatran Ždírec nad Doubravou
Slavoj TKZ Polná
TJ Sokol Tasovice
AFC Humpolec
TJ Sokol Lanžhot
SK Bystřice n. Pernštejnem
FK Hodonín
FSC Stará Říše
FC Spartak Velká Bíteš
TJ Start Brno

Group E 
FC TVD Slavičín
1. HFK Olomouc
FK Šumperk
SK Hranice
1. FC Viktorie Přerov
FC Vsetín
FK Kozlovice
FK Nové Sady, Olomouc
Slovan Bzenec
TJ Valašské Meziříčí
FC Strání
SFK ELKO Holešov
TJ Skaštice
Tatran Všechovice

Group F 
MFK Vítkovice
MFK Havířov
SK Jiskra Rýmařov
SK Beskyd Frenštát pod Radhoštěm
SFC Opava B
FK Nový Jičín
1. BFK Frýdlant nad Ostravicí
SK Dětmarovice
FC Heřmanice Slezská, Ostrava
FK Bospor Bohumín
FC Slavoj Olympia Bruntál
MFK Karviná B
FK SK Polanka, Ostrava
FK Fotbal Třinec B

Fifth level - Regional championship-krajský přebor

Prague - Prague Championship 
FC Přední Kopanina
FK Admira Prague B
Sokol Kolovraty
FC Zličín
FK Újezd nad Lesy
FC Slavoj Vyšehrad B
FK Viktoria Žižkov B
FK Motorlet Prague B
SK Újezd Praha 4
FK Dukla Jižní Město
SK Uhelné sklady Prague
SK Hostivař
Sokol Královice
AFK Slavoj Podolí Prague
Olympia Radotín
SK Třeboradice

Středočeský kraj (Central Bohemia) 
SK Polaban Nymburk
FK Dobrovice
FC Velim
FK Bohemia Poděbrady
FC Sellier & Bellot Vlašim B
SK Posázavan Poříčí nad Sázavou
FC Komárov
Sokol Nové Strašecí
FK Slovan Lysá nad Labem
AFK Tuchlovice
SK Lhota
Sokol Nespeky
TJ Klíčany
SK Hřebeč
SK Hvozdnice
FK Kosoř

Jihočeský kraj (South Bohemia) 
FK Slavoj Český Krumlov
Sokol Čížová
FK Jiskra Třeboň
FC MAS Táborsko B
SK Jankov
FK Lažiště
Sokol Sezimovo Ústí
TJ Dražice
FK Protivín
TJ Blatná
FC ZVVZ Milevsko
TJ Osek
SK Rudolfov
FK Olešník
SK Siko Čimelice
FK Junior Strakonice, z. s.

Plzeňský kraj (Plzeň Region) 
SKP Okula Nýrsko
SK Slavia Vejprnice
ZKZ Horní Bříza
FK Staňkov
TJ Start Tlumačov
FK Holýšov
Sokol Lhota
SSC Bolevec (Plzeň)
Jiskra Domažlice B
FO Baník Stříbro
TJ Zruč
FC Chotíkov 1932
SKP Rapid Sport (Plzeň)
FK Nepomuk
TJ Sokol Plzeň-Černice
TJ ZD Meclov

Karlovarský kraj (Karlovy Vary Region) 
FC Cheb
SK Toužim
Baník Královské Poříčí
Baník Union Nové Sedlo
FK Nejdek
FC Františkovy Lázně
FK Žlutice
TJ Spartak Chodov
OSS Lomnice
Spartak Horní Slavkov
FC Slavia Karlovy Vary B
Lokomotiva Karlovy Vary
FK Nová Role
TJ Olympie Hroznětín

Ústecký kraj (Ústí nad Labem Region) 
FK Litoměřicko (Litoměřice)
Mostecký FK (Most)
SK Brná (Ústí nad Labem)
ASK Lovosice
TJ Krupka
TJ Oldřichov
TJ Baník Modlany
TJ Sokol Domoušice
FK Jílové z. s.
Sokol Srbice
FK Jiskra Modrá
Sokol Horní Jiřetín
FK Slavoj Žatec
TJ Spartak Perštejn
SK Stap-Tratec Vilémov
FK Tatran Kadaň

Liberecký kraj (Liberec Region) 
FK Sedmihorky
Jiskra Mšeno-Jablonec n. N.
Jiskra Višňová
FC Nový Bor
Slovan Hrádek nad Nisou
FK ŽBS Železný Brod
TJ Desná
FK Stráž pod Ralskem
TJ Doksy
TJ Spartak Chrastava
Sokol Rovensko pod Troskami
FK Turnov
SK Skalice u České Lípy
Slovan Frýdlant

Královéhradecký kraj (Hradec Králové Region) 
TJ Červený Kostelec
TJ Dobruška
FK Chlumec nad Cidlinou
TJ Sokol Třebeš
SK Jiskra Hořice
Spartak Rychnov nad Kněžnou
Spartak Police nad Metují
FK Kostelec nad Orlicí
FC Slavia Hradec Králové
SK Libčany
FK Černilov
RMSK Cidlina Nový Bydžov
FC Vrchlabí
FK Vysoká nad Labem
Olympia Hradec Králové-Kratonohy
SK Jičín

Pardubický kraj (Pardubice Region) 
TJ Svitavy
SK Holice
SKP Slovan Moravská Třebová
FK Agria Choceň
TJ Sokol Moravany
TJ Jiskra Litomyšl
MFK Chrudim B
FK Česká Třebová
TJ Lanškroun, fotbalový oddíl
Sportovní kluby Polička
TJ Luže
SK Pardubičky
FK Jiskra Heřmanův Městec
ŽSK Třemošnice
FK Horní Ředice
TJ Sokol Rohovládova Bělá

Vysočina (Vysočina Region) 
HFK Třebíč
FK Pelhřimov
TJ Sapeli Polná
SK Přibyslav
FC Slavoj Žirovnice
FC Velké Meziříčí B
FC Chotěboř
FC Náměšť nad Oslavou-Vícenice
FK Kovofiniš Ledeč nad Sázavou
TJ Nová Ves
SK Huhtamaki Okříšky
TJ Dálnice Speřice
TJ Sokol Bedřichov
Sokol Šebkovice

Jihomoravský kraj (South Moravia) 
FC Boskovice
FK Baník Ratíškovice
FC Dosta Bystrc-Kníničky (Brno)
FK Mutěnice
FC Ivančice
Tatran Rousínov
FC Kuřim
FC Moravský Krumlov
FC Sparta Brno
FK SK Bosonohy (Brno)
TJ Tatran Bohunice (Brno)
SK Líšeň B
SK Moravská Slavia Brno
TJ Sokol Krumvíř
SK Olympia Ráječko
FC Svratka Brno

Olomoucký kraj (Olomouc Region) 
SK Sulko Zábřeh
FK Mohelnice
FK Šternberk
FC Kralice na Hané
TJ Tatran Litovel
FC Dolany
Sokol Ústí
FK Jeseník
TJ Sokol Opatovice
TJ Sigma Lutín
TJ Sokol Velké Losiny
TJ Medlov
FC Želatovice
FK Bohuňovice
SK Lipová
Slovan Černovír (Olomouc)

Zlínský kraj (Zlín Region)
FC Slušovice
FK Luhačovice
FC Brumov
FC RAK Provodov
FC Morkovice
TJ Nedašov
FK Bystřice pod Hostýnem
SK Baťov 1930 (Otrokovice)
FC Kvasice
SK Boršice
FC Velké Karlovice+Karolinka
TJ Sokol Nevšová
FS Napajedla
TJ Štítná nad Vláří

Moravskoslezský kraj (Moravian-Silesian Region) 
TJ Lokomotiva Petrovice
FK Krnov
SK Beskyd Čeladná
FK Bílovec
Fotbal Fulnek 
SK Brušperk
TJ Břidličná
FK Český Těšín
TJ Háj ve Slezsku
FK Šenov
TJ Unie Hlubina (Ostrava)
TJ Sokol Kobeřice
Dolní Datyně - Havířov
SK Moravan Oldřišov
Sport-Club Pustá Polom
TJ Bystřice

Other active clubs

References

 
Czech Republic
Football

pt:Clubes de Futebol da República Tcheca
zh:捷克足球甲级联赛